MP, Mp, mp or .mp may refer to:

Arts and entertainment
 M.P. (opera), an 1811 comic opera by Thomas Moore and Charles Edward Horn
 Magic point, or mana point, in role-playing games
  (mp), a musical dynamic meaning "medium-quiet" or "moderately-quiet"
 Multiplayer, in gaming
 Multipremier, a Mexican television network
 , whose station identification is "mp"
 Mario Party, a series of vídeo games by Nintendo

Businesses and organizations

Government
 Member of parliament
 Ministry of Planning, Budget, and Management (Brazil), a cabinet-level federal ministry in Brazil
 Public Ministry (Portugal), the body of the Judiciary of Portugal
 Public Prosecutor's Office (Brazil), the Brazilian body of independent public prosecutors

Police
 Military police, law enforcement agencies connected with, or part of, the military of a state
 Mumbai Police, the police force of the city of Mumbai, Maharashtra
 Municipal police, law enforcement agencies that are under the control of local government
 Metropolitan police, municipal police of major metropolitan areas

Politics
 Green Party (Sweden), a political party in Sweden based upon green politics
 Progressive Movement (Cameroon), a minor opposition political party in Cameroon
 Member of Parliament (United Kingdom), individual elected to serve in the House of Commons of the Parliament of the United Kingdom

Other businesses and organizations
 Martinair (IATA airline designator MP), Dutch cargo airline
 , a Finnish football (soccer) club
Ming Pao, a Hong Kong newspaper
 Missouri Pacific Railroad (reporting mark MP), one of the first railroads in the United States west of the Mississippi River
 Mueller and Pfleger, a subsidiary of aquarium suppliers Eheim

Law
 , a Latin expression meaning by one's own hand
 Provisory measure, in Brazilian law
 Missing person

Linguistics
 Mp (digraph), in many African languages
 Malayo-Polynesian languages of Southeast Asia
 Minimalist program, a syntactic theory in linguistics

Places
 Madhya Pradesh, a state in India
 Manipur Pradesh, a term used to refer to Manipur by various political parties
 Mandatory Palestine, a former British protectorate
 Northern Mariana Islands (ISO 3166-1 alpha-2 country code and U.S. postal abbreviation MP), an insular area and commonwealth of the United States

Science and technology

Computing
 .mp, Internet country code top-level domain (ccTLD) for Northern Mariana Islands
 Management Point, in the Advanced Client of Microsoft's System Center Configuration Manager
 Massive parallelism (disambiguation)
 Media player (disambiguation)
 Media processor, a type of digital signal processor designed to deal with streaming data in real-time
 Megapixel, a unit of a million pixels
 Merge Point, in the MPLS local protection approach to network resiliency
 Microprocessor, a computer processor with a minimal number of integrated circuits
 Microsoft Project, project-management software
 Multilink Protocol (or Multilink PPP), a method for spreading traffic across multiple point-to-point protocol connections
 Multi-platform, describing software that is implemented on multiple computer platforms
 Multiprocessing, the use of two or more central processing units within a single computer system

Mathematics

 Maximum parsimony (phylogenetics), in statistical analysis
 , in propositional logic, a Latin expression meaning "mode that affirms"

Physics

 Megapond (Mp), a non-SI Metric unit of force, also known as a tonne-force
 Melting point, the temperature at which a solid becomes a liquid
 mp, the mass of a proton

Other uses in science and technology
 Machine pistol, typically a handgun-style machine gun, capable of fully automatic or burst fire
 Macrophage, a type of white blood cell that engulfs and digests cellular debris, foreign substances, microbes and cancer cells
 Mammal Paleogene zone, in geology, a type of zone in the stratigraphic record

 Meralgia paraesthetica (MP), a sensation of numbness in the outer thigh
 Methylphenidate, a stimulant medication
 Microprinting (MP), a method of printing very finely as an anti-counterfeiting mechanism
 Møller–Plesset perturbation theory, a post-Hartree–Fock method used in computational chemistry

 Monoprinting (M/P), a type of printmaking producing a single print
 Movement protein, proteins encoded by plant viruses to facilitate cell-to-cell transmission

Sport 
 Mikkelin Palloilijat (MP), a Finnish football club
 MP Motorsport, a Dutch auto racing team

Other uses
 , a historical Polish money unit

 Masterpoints, awarded for successful performance at contract bridge; see Glossary of contract bridge terms
 Matchpoints, a method of scoring in contract bridge; see Glossary of contract bridge terms
 Mile post
 Roman mile

See also
 MP, a brand of Russian firearms by Izhevsk Mechanical Plant, including:
 MP-71
 MP-412 REX
 MP-443 Grach, (Pistolet Yarygina)
 MP-444 (Bagira)
 MP-445 (Varyag)
 MP-446 Viking
 MP-448 Skyph
 MP, one of several models of rubber-tyred rolling stock on the Paris Métro, notably:
 MP 59
 MP 73
 MP 89
 MP 05
 File formats developed by the Moving Picture Experts Group (MPEG):
 MP1
 MP2
 MP3
 MP4
 MPS (disambiguation)
 Metropolitan Police Service (MPS), the police force of Greater London
 Metacarpophalangeal joint (MCP), situated between the metacarpal bones and the proximal phalanges of the digits